Ralph Ernest Powers (April 27, 1875 – January 31, 1952) was an American amateur mathematician who worked on prime numbers.

In 1934 he verified that the Mersenne number  is composite.

Life
Powers was born in Fountain, Colorado Territory. Details of his life are little-known, though he appears to have been an employee of the Denver and Rio Grande Western Railroad.

After his own discoveries of Mersenne primes in 1911 and 1914, no Mersenne primes were discovered until Raphael M. Robinson used a computer to find the next two, on January 30, 1952, the night before Powers's death.

Works
 ‘The Tenth Perfect Number', American Mathematical Monthly, Vol. 18 (1911), pp. 195–7
 ’On Mersenne's Numbers', Proceedings of the London Mathematical Society, Vol. 13 (1914), p. xxxix
 'A Mersenne Prime', Bulletin of the American Mathematical Society, Vol. 20, No. 10 (1914), p. 531
 ’Certain composite Mersenne's numbers', Proceedings of the London Mathematical Society Vol. 15 (1916), p. xxii
 (with D. H. Lehmer) 'On Factoring Large Numbers', Bulletin of the American Mathematical Society, Vol. 37. No. 10 (1931), pp. 770–76
 ’Note on a Mersenne Number', Bulletin of the American Mathematical Society, Vol. 40, No. 12 (1934), p. 883

See also
 Continued fraction factorization

References

External links
 The Prime Pages website
 Mersenne and Fermat Numbers (Robinson); brief treatment of Powers
 The Tenth Perfect Number, an article by Powers announcing the primality of M89

1875 births
1952 deaths
Number theorists